Five Wells is a Neolithic chambered tomb between the villages of Chelmorton and Taddington on Taddington Moor in the Derbyshire Peak District in England.

The tomb is a protected scheduled ancient monument. Three stones mark the main chamber, which has been dramatically reduced; a second less well-preserved chamber is to the west. The chambers have paved floors. Bateman discovered the remains of at least twelve human skeletons. Subsequent excavations (by Llewellyn Jewitt, William Lukis and Micah Salt between 1862 and 1901) found further human remains, pottery and flint tools in the chambers and passages and a separate cist (stone coffin) within the mound.

Access can be made on foot via a permitted path from Pillwell Gate to the west. Access along the permitted path can also be made from the Limestone Way long-distance footpath, which runs along Sough Lane  to the east.

References

Megalithic monuments in England
Stone Age sites in England
Archaeological sites in Derbyshire
Buildings and structures in Derbyshire
Tourist attractions in Derbyshire
Scheduled monuments in Derbyshire
Tombs in the United Kingdom
Derbyshire Dales